The Mid-Maryland Celtic Festival (formerly the Frederick Celtic Festival) is a one-day festival celebrating all things Scottish, held annually in Mt. Airy, Maryland, United States. 

The festival features kilted professional and amateur Highland Games athletes competing for victory tossing cabers and throwing heavy weights. Other activities include Celtic music, competitions, bagpipe playing, crafts, vendors, Scottish and Irish dancing, and free genealogy services.

Historically held in Urbana and Frederick (MD), starting in 2012 the festival is held annually on the second Saturday each May at the Mt. Airy Fire Department Fairgrounds which are located at 1003 Twin Arch Road, Mt. Airy, MD 21771. Festival hours are 9am to 6pm and now have been expanded to include a British car show co-sponsored by the Clustered Spires British Car Club of Frederick, MD and expanded dog/herding events. 

There was no festival in 2020.

References

External links
 
 Carroll County Times story

Folk festivals in the United States
Music festivals in Maryland
Irish-American culture in Maryland
Irish dance
Scottish-American history
Scottish-American culture in Maryland
Scottish music
Celtic music festivals
Highland games
Multi-sport events in the United States
Welsh-American culture in Maryland
Sports festivals in the United States